DeBlois is a settlement in Prince Edward Island.

See also 
 List of communities in Prince Edward Island

References

Communities in Prince County, Prince Edward Island